Pseudotephritina inaequalis is a species of picture-winged fly in the family Ulidiidae.

Distribution
United States.

References

Insects described in 1931
Ulidiidae
Taxa named by John Russell Malloch
Diptera of North America